Inuvik (Mike Zubko) Airport  is located  east of Inuvik, Northwest Territories, Canada.

The airport is classified as an airport of entry by Nav Canada and is staffed by the Canada Border Services Agency (CBSA). CBSA officers at this airport can handle general aviation aircraft only, with no more than 15 passengers.

It is also used as a forward operating base for CF-18 Hornet military jets operated by the Royal Canadian Air Force.

In 1995, the airport was named for Mike Zubko (1923–1991), a famous local aviator.

Airlines and destinations 

Inuvik has scheduled jet airline service provided by Canadian North using Boeing 737-200 and 737-300 jetliners.

Accidents and incidents
On 4 November 2010, a hangar fire destroyed three aircraft owned by Kenn Borek Air and operated by Aklak Air. They were de Havilland Canada DHC-6 Twin Otter C-GZVH, Beechcraft King Air C-GHOC and Beechcraft 99 C-GKKB.

See also
Inuvik/Shell Lake Water Aerodrome

References

External links
 Page about this airport on COPA's Places to Fly airport directory

Airports in the Arctic
Certified airports in the Inuvik Region
Inuvik